Guthrie may refer to:

People
 Guthrie (surname), a family name originating in Scotland
 Guthrie baronets in the United Kingdom
 Clan Guthrie, a Scottish clan
 Guthrie Govan (born 1971), British guitar virtuoso and guitar teacher

Places
 Hundred of Guthrie, County of Way, South Australia
 Guthrie, Ontario, Canada
 Guthrie, Angus, Scotland

United States
 Guthrie, Arizona
 Guthrie, Illinois
 Guthrie, Indiana
 Guthrie, Kentucky
 Guthrie, Michigan
 Guthrie, Missouri

 Guthrie, Oklahoma
 Guthrie, Texas
 Guthrie, West Virginia
 Guthrie, Wisconsin
 Guthrie County, Iowa
 Guthrie Township, Hubbard County, Minnesota

Other
 Guthrie (company), a Malaysian plantation company
 Guthrie test, a medical test performed on newborn infants to detect phenylketonuria
 Guthrie Theater, theater company in Minneapolis, Minnesota
 Guthrie's, an American restaurant chain

See also